Kebili is a town in the south of Tunisia and one of the main cities in the Nefzaoua region. It is located south of Tunisia. It is the capital of the Kebili Governorate.

History 

Kebili is one of the oldest oases in Tunisia and North Africa. It holds the earliest hard evidence of human habitation in Tunisia (found near the town) and dates back about 200,000 years. Kebili, along with many other Tunisian cities, became part of the Roman Empire after the Punic Wars.

Demographics 

Kebili's population is more diverse compared to other Tunisian governorates. The population traces its roots to three main groups:

Berbers: The native inhabitants of Tunisia and North Africa.
Arabs: They came to Kebili in the early days of the Muslim conquest. Most came from the Southern Arabian Peninsula (modern day Saudi Arabia and Yemen). They still hold the tribal names of their ancestors.
Black Africans: They were brought to the city when it was a slavery trade center. See the Economy section below.

Language and religion 

While Arabic is the dominant language in the region, several differences set it apart from the Tunisian Arabic spoken elsewhere in the country. Most notably, the letter qāf  is pronounced as a  rather than the guttural . Bedouin vocabulary and expressions have declined in usage among the new generations.

Islam is the dominant religion. Kebili, as many other Tunisian towns, holds a great number of Soofiat Maqams (Saleheen).

Economy 

The economy of Kebili has seen diverse orientations throughout its history. Kebili was one of the main hubs of the African slavery trade to satisfy European needs. Slaves were taken to Europe through the port of Gabès. Nowadays, Kebili relies heavily on agriculture and tourism.

Agriculture 

The main agricultural product in the region are dates or "deglets". Kebili produces a very high quality date, exported all around the world and contributing significantly to the local and national economy.

Tourism 

Since national independence, the government of Tunisia has encouraged tourism projects and resorts in the Saharan region. Of these Douz, south of Kebili, is the most famous Saharian destination of Tunisia (known as the Sahara Gate).

Climate

Temperature records have been kept here from 1901–1939, 1949–1953, and 2000–2012. The French colonial authorities of the Service météorologique de Tunis maintained the older records. A portion of the original data logs for this early period is in the NCDC archives and at the POR of 1907 to 1932. Like Azizia, Kebili is subject to the foehn-like wind phenomena known as a Ghibili.

Gallery

Notable people
 Hend Sabry (born 1979), Tunisian actress, lawyer and ambassador to the World Food Programme
Fahmi Blidaoui Radio Nefzawa, the voice of the south of Tunisia | United Nations Educational, Scientific and Cultural Organization (born 1988), Tunisian journalist, and director  of radio nefzawa

References

Notes

External links 

 Lexicorient
 Kebili Guide
 Collection of photos

Populated places in Kebili Governorate
Oases of Tunisia
Communes of Tunisia